Jean-Jacques Delvaux (10 August 1942, Saint-Omer – 6 June 2017) was a French politician who served in the National Assembly from 1993 to 1997. representing Pas-de-Calais's 8th constituency. He died of cancer at the age of 74 in 2017.

References

1942 births
2017 deaths
People from Saint-Omer
Politicians from Hauts-de-France
Rally for the Republic politicians
Union for a Popular Movement politicians
Deputies of the 10th National Assembly of the French Fifth Republic
Deaths from cancer in France